Oluklu (literally "grooved" in Turkish) may refer to the following places in Turkey:

 Oluklu, Adıyaman, a village in the central district of Adyaman Province
 Oluklu, Bayramören
 Oluklu, Kahta, a village in the district of Kâhta, Adıyaman Province
 Oluklu, Selim, a village in the district of Selim, Kars Province
 Oluklu, Söğüt, a village in the district of Söğüt, Bilecik Province